This is a list of Mesoamerican tlatoque of the altepetl of Tetzcoco from the first tlatoani in 1298 to the end of the line of indigenous rulers. From the early 15th century to 1521, Tetzcoco was one of the three leading members of the Triple Alliance, commonly known as the Aztec Empire, but was often subservient to the rulers of Tenochtitlan. The Aztec Empire was conquered by Spain in 1521, but the Spanish colonial authorities continued to appoint tlatoque of Tetzcoco until the office was abolished in 1564.

Pre-colonial rulers (1298–1521)

Early Tetzcoco (1298–1431) 
The tlatoque of Tetzcoco were descendants and successors of earlier tlatoque of the Chichimeca, succeeding Xolotl (1172–1232), Nopaltzin (1232–1263) and Tlotzin (1263–1298).

In the Triple Alliance (1431–1521)

Colonial period (1521–1564) 
The line of tlatoque continued in Tetzococo after the Spanish conquest. Adept at navigating the new Spanish colonial governing system and adapting to changing circumstances, many of the nobles of Tetzcoco, including the tlatoque, came through the cataclysmic downfall of the Aztec Empire in a stronger position than they had been previously. Allowing the nobility of Tetzcoco to continue to appoint local rulers of the same pre-colonial dynasty was also beneficial for the Spaniards, who utilized their legitimacy to ensure the delivery of tribute and political subordination.

The state of affairs in Tetzcoco after the death of Ihuian in 1564 is unclear given that few surviving sources discuss local politics during this time. It seems that the position of tlatoani was left vacant due to interfamilial conflict in regard to who was to be the next ruler, which in turn led to the office being entirely replaced by the Spanish-appointed governors of the city.

See also 
The other leaders of the Triple Alliance:
List of rulers of Tenochtitlan
List of rulers of Tlacopan
History of the Aztecs

References

Bibliography 

 
Texcoco
Tlatoque
Texcoco